The 1984 Individual Long Track World Championship was the 14th edition of the FIM speedway Individual Long Track World Championship. The event was held on 16 September 1984 at the Herxheim in Germany which was West Germany at the time.

The world title was won by Erik Gundersen of Denmark.

Final Classification 

 E = eliminated (no further ride)
 f = fell
 ef = engine failure
 x = excluded

References 

1984
Speedway competitions in Germany
Sport in West Germany
Sports competitions in West Germany
Motor
Motor